The 1994 UCI Road World Championships took place in Agrigento, Italy between 21 and 28 August 1994.

Events summary

References

 
UCI Road World Championships by year
World Championships
Uci Road World Championships
August 1994 sports events in Europe
Sport in Agrigento